Dallas Plantation is a plantation in Franklin County, Maine, United States. The population was 304 at the 2020 census.

Geography

Demographics

As of the census of 2000, there were 250 people, 110 households, and 77 families residing in the plantation.  The population density was 6.4 people per square mile (2.5/km2).  There were 371 housing units at an average density of 9.5 per square mile (3.7/km2).  The racial makeup of the plantation was 98.40% White and 1.60% Native American.

There were 110 households, out of which 26.4% had children under the age of 18 living with them, 61.8% were married couples living together, 3.6% had a female householder with no husband present, and 29.1% were non-families. 20.0% of all households were made up of individuals, and 10.9% had someone living alone who was 65 years of age or older.  The average household size was 2.27 and the average family size was 2.53.

In the plantation the population was spread out, with 18.8% under the age of 18, 7.6% from 18 to 24, 27.6% from 25 to 44, 31.6% from 45 to 64, and 14.4% who were 65 years of age or older.  The median age was 42 years. For every 100 females, there were 98.4 males.  For every 100 females age 18 and over, there were 105.1 males.

The median income for a household in the plantation was $36,875, and the median income for a family was $39,000. Males had a median income of $25,000 versus $17,813 for females. The per capita income for the plantation was $17,370.  About 6.4% of families and 11.4% of the population were below the poverty line, including 13.5% of those under the age of eighteen and 3.8% of those 65 or over.

References

Plantations in Franklin County, Maine
Plantations in Maine